is a Japanese software testing company, headquartered in Tokyo, that provides software quality assurance and software testing solutions.

Overview 
SHIFT Inc. was founded in 2005 by Masaru Tange, who was a manufacturing process improvement consultant.
In the earliest years, it was a tiny consulting company specializing in manufacturing and business process improvements. In 2007, it entered the software testing industry by undertaking consultancy work for the improvement of E-commerce testing. In 2009, Tange changed the company's direction from the process improvement consultancy to the software testing business. The company then grew so rapidly to be listed on the Tokyo Stock Exchange Mothers market in 2014. In April 2020, it has the market capitalization of 143 billion yen ($1.3 billion), which is the largest of the listed Japanese companies specialized in software quality assurance and testing services.

The company covers software testing outsourcing, project management office and test strategy planning supports, test execution, test design, automated testing, software inspection, and educational program services.

Notes

References

External links 
 SHIFT Inc.

Software companies of Japan
Service companies based in Tokyo
Software testing
Companies listed on the Tokyo Stock Exchange
Japanese companies established in 2005
Software companies established in 2005